The North Dakota State Bison football program represents North Dakota State University in college football at the NCAA Division I Football Championship Subdivision level and competes in the Missouri Valley Football Conference. The Bison play in the 19,000 seat Fargodome located in Fargo. The Bison have won 17 national championships and 37 conference championships. They have won nine NCAA Division I AA FCS National Championships between 2011 and 2021. The Bison hold the record for most overall NCAA national championships and the record for the most consecutive championships with five titles between 2011 and 2015 for Division I FCS.

Since 2011, the North Dakota State Bison have a record of 149–12 which included a record 22-game playoff win streak, making them the most successful college football program in Division I FCS this decade. The Bison are 202–39 since moving to Division I in 2004. Since 1964, the Bison have had only three losing seasons and an overall record of 551–136–4 through that 58-year span, one of the best in all of college football. Among FCS programs, North Dakota State has more all-time program wins than any non-Ivy League  program, over 750. Of all teams established after 1894, only Oklahoma has won a higher percentage of its games than NDSU. The team also holds the record for the longest winning streak in the Football Championship Subdivision, which stands at 39 consecutive games spanning from 2017 to 2021.

In the final AP Football Poll of the 2013–14 season; after their third consecutive National Championship, North Dakota State finished with 17 votes which ranked them at #29 in all of D-I football, the highest end-of-season ranking of any team in the history of FCS football. After defeating 13th-ranked (FBS) Iowa in 2016, the Bison earned 74 votes and a #27 ranking in the entire D-I field, overtaking their previous record to become the highest-ranked FCS team of all time.

Collectively, the Bison have won 37 conference championships, and 17 national championships. They were selected as NCAA College Division II champions by polling three times (1965, 1968, 1969), won the NCAA Division II National Football Championship five times (1983, 1985, 1986, 1988, 1990), and have won the NCAA Division I Football Championship nine times in eleven seasons (2011, 2012, 2013, 2014, 2015, 2017, 2018, 2019, 2021). The 2019 Bison are the first of any Division 1 team since 1894 Yale to finish 16–0.  From 2012 to 2014, the Bison had a formerly FCS record of 33 straight wins (which is tied for the third longest in modern NCAA history).  They subsequently had a 39-game winning streak that ran from 2017 to 2020.

History

Early history (1894–1921)

The Bison fielded their first team in 1894 and were originally known as the NDAC Farmers. From the early 1900s to 1921, the nickname of the school then known as North Dakota Agricultural College was the Aggies. The first coach for the new NDAC football team was Henry Bolley, who also fielded the first football program at Purdue University in 1887 and was their first Quarterback. He challenged the University of North Dakota to a football match in 1890, but did not have enough players until 1894, the first official year of football at NDSU. In 1902, Eddie Cochems, known as the father of the forward pass was hired as head coach of the Bison where he experimented building an offense around his new technique; which subsequently became legal in the 1906 college football season; Cochems went 9–1 in his 2-year stint as head coach. The college hired famed Michigan halfback Paul Magoffin, the first player to ever catch a forward pass in 1907, as head coach, but he left for the head coaching position offered to him by George Washington University a year later. The 1918 season was canceled due to the outbreak of the Spanish Flu in conjunction with the first World War. The 1943 and 1944 seasons were also canceled due to World War II and the shortage of eligible players. Keeping with their Michigan favoritism, the NDAC hired Stanley Borleske in 1919 to coach the football, basketball, and baseball teams. After six years of on and off coaching. and a 36–36–7 record, Borleske left for Fresno State but is largely credited with developing the Bison mascot. It was well known he was not a fan of the "Aggies" mascot, wanting something 'strong and fierce' he came up with the 'Bison' which remains the mascot today. He also coined the term "Thundering Herd" which is still a common reference to the NDSU Bison Football fanbase.

Division II (1922–2003)

In 1921, NDSU became a charter member of the now-defunct North Central Conference, which they remained affiliated with for 82 years until 2003. Their primary rival during this time were the University of North Dakota Fighting Sioux (now the Fighting Hawks) whom they competed with to win the Nickel Trophy. As members of Division II, they won 8 national championships with an overall record of 347–94–4 having only 2 losing seasons from 1964 to 2003.

Division I-FCS (2004–present)
In 2004, all North Dakota State athletic teams moved to Division I. From 2004 to 2007, the Bison were members of the Great West Football Conference. Since 2008 they have been affiliated with the Missouri Valley Football Conference. Since moving to Division I, their primary rival are the South Dakota State University Jackrabbits whom they compete with each year for the Dakota Marker. The team's former head coach was Craig Bohl, who led the Bison from 2003 to 2013, holds the school record for most wins by a head coach, going 104–32 in his tenure at NDSU. Bohl's successor Chris Klieman went 69–6 in his five seasons (2014–2018). During the Bison's successful run to the 2018 FCS title, Klieman was named as the successor to the retiring Bill Snyder as head coach at Kansas State, though both schools agreed that Klieman would remain at NDSU while the Bison were involved in the FCS playoffs. Bison defensive coordinator Matt Entz took over as head coach following that season's championship game.

The NDSU Bison are the only FCS program to ever be ranked higher than #34 in the AP National Football Poll. After the 2011 Championship Game, the Bison became only the third team in FCS history to receive votes in the final AP Top 25 with 2, putting them at #32 overall (FCS Record); the others being Appalachian State who receive 5 votes after their third consecutive FCS Championship in 2007 and ended at #34 and James Madison University after their 2010 upset of then #13 Virginia Tech. After the 2012 season, the Bison again broke the barrier and became the first ever FCS team to breach the poll twice by receiving 1 vote and ending at #36 in the nation. Due to the overwhelming support and attention NDSU got during this run, ESPN announced that it would host its ESPN College GameDay program in downtown Fargo on September 21, 2013. The Bison ended up beating Delaware State 51–0 later that day. The Bison finished the 2013 regular season with an undefeated 11–0 record, their first perfect season since 1990. The Bison became the first FCS team to ever finish the regular season ranked on the AP Poll at #34 with 1 vote. After a perfect season (15–0) and winning their third consecutive championship game. After the 2013 season, the Bison were ranked #29 in the National Division I AP Poll, tallying a massive 17 votes, far beyond what any other FCS team had ever received. After defeating Iowa in 2016 the Bison were ranked 27th in the AP Poll with 74 votes, the highest ranking of any team in FCS history.

2013 season

The 2013 team had a perfect 15–0 season, becoming the first program to do that since Marshall in 1996. They won their third consecutive national championship, tying an FCS record. A majority of the starters played in all 3 national championship games and went 43–2 in their 3-year stint, a number unrivaled in Division I FCS football. The Bison only lost 2 games in the three-year span by a combined 6 points. Through 2013, the Bison outscored their opponents by a combined 581–169 (+412) on the season. Only two other teams in FCS history have had a larger point spread through a season, 1996 Marshall (+448) and 1999 Georgia Southern (+485). Unlike the Marshall and Georgia Southern teams, NDSU's defense held their opponents to just 127 points in the regular season (11.5 ppg) and just 11 point on average through the playoffs that year. NDSU won its playoff games with an average margin of victory of 32.75 points, which just falls behind the 1996 Marshall team, which averaged a 34-point spread. In 2013, the Bison tallied three shutouts, and held nine teams to 10 points or less, including a streak of nine consecutive quarters without allowing a point. The offense was known for a ground-and-pound strategy, which wore opponents down and controlled the time of possession. The team averaged over 34 minutes of possession per game, while allowing an average of just 250 yards of opposing offense. In the 12 playoff games they played from 2011 to 2013, they allowed an average of 9.3 points per game, an FCS record. The only playoff loss the seniors experienced in their 4-year career was the  38–31 OT loss at eventual champion Eastern Washington in 2010 in the FCS quarterfinals. The span of seasons that followed for NDSU in the years after that overtime loss are easily the best and most dominant years Division I football has seen from a single team.

After the 2013 season, following three consecutive national titles Head Coach Craig Bohl was hired away to lead the Mountain West's Wyoming Cowboys. Bohl finished his time at NDSU having successfully transitioned the program from Division II to Division I and built into the premier FCS powerhouse in the nation that continues today He finished at NDSU with a career record of 104–32.

Chris Klieman era (2014–2018) 
Following Bohl's departure, defensive coordinator Chris Klieman was promoted to head coach.

In 2014, after beating their 5th consecutive FBS team, Iowa State, and their subsequent game against Weber State; which was their 26th straight victory, ESPN again announced they would bring College GameDay back to downtown Fargo on September 13, 2014 to cover the Bison's amazing run for the second straight year. The visit marked first time the show has ever visited the same FCS school twice and only the 6th time they have visited a non-FBS school since 1993.The Bison won an FCS record 33 straight games from 2012 to 2014, which is also the 3rd longest in the history of Division 1 NCAA football. From 2010 to 2014, the Bison did not lose a single road game, a span of 22 games. They also had a winning streak of 26 home games (2012–2015) and have a record streak of 22 wins in the FCS playoffs. The Bison have won 16 straight home openers since their 1999 loss to Ferris State and are 21–1 in home openers since the Fargodome opened in 1992. 2015 would start with a surprise loss to #13 Montana broadcast nationally on ESPN, however the season would extend both the MVFC run and National Championship run to five consecutive titles culminating in a 37–10 national title game against Jacksonville State. After this season, quarterback Carson Wentz was selected second overall by the Philadelphia Eagles in the 2016 NFL Draft.

2016 brought about one of the high points in Bison football history when, in week three, NDSU defeated #13 ranked Iowa on the road. Despite the impressive win, 2016 would be the worst season for the team since 2010. Not only would the team have the fewest wins since 2010 (12), they also lost the Dakota Marker for the first time since 2009. Ultimately the season would bring about the end of the Bison's historic title run with a semifinal loss against the eventual champion James Madison Dukes.

2017 would be a return to form for NDSU, only two games all season were decided by one possession, the best mark since the 2013 season. On December 15, NDSU became the only team in FCS history to make 7 consecutive semifinal appearances in the playoffs. In the title match the Bison would get revenge for the previous season defeating James Madison 17–13 in Frisco.

The 2018 season would arguably top the 2013 season as the best in school history. NDSU went 15–0 for the second time in school history and had only one game all season decided by less than one touchdown (the Dakota Marker match up against #3 South Dakota State). NDSU captured their seventh title in eight years and Chris Klieman's fourth in five. The 2018 Bison defeated opponents by an average score of 41.5 – 12.6, good for a score differential of 28.9 points. The season saw quarterback Easton Stick finish his college career with a record of 49–3, the highest win total for any quarterback in FCS history. Right before the semi-final matchup against South Dakota State Klieman was hired by former Bison athletic director Gene Taylor to lead the Kansas State Wildcats, he was allowed to finish the season with NDSU.

On March 4, 2019, President Donald Trump hosted the NDSU football team at the White House. They were served fast food, as was FBS-champion Clemson. Easton Stick presented a number 45 NDSU football jersey to Trump. The visit was orchestrated by Senator John Hoeven.

Matt Entz era (2019–present) 
On December 13, 2018 NDSU announced defensive coordinator Matt Entz would replace Chris Klieman as head coach. The Bison started the 2019 season with 57–10 victory over Butler in front of record breaking "home" crowd of 34,544 at Minneapolis' Target Field. 2019 saw the first match game in-state rival North Dakota since 2015. The Bison were victorious over the Fighting Hawks 38–7 in front of the largest Fargodome crowd (18,923) since NDSU hosted Northern Iowa for Homecoming in 2015(18,954). On October 20, 2019 in was announced that ESPN would be bringing their College GameDay program to Brookings, South Dakota to cover the Dakota Marker featuring #3 South Dakota State and #1 North Dakota State. The Bison defeated SDSU 23–16. On January 11, 2020, NDSU won another FCS title after defeating James Madison University 28–20, and also became the first Division 1 team since 1894 Yale to finish 16–0.

On May 2, 2021 the NDSU Bison, under Entz, ended a 3 championship win streak by losing 24-20 to Sam Houston State University in the Quarter finals of the 2020 FCS Playoffs. This is the first time since 2010 that the NDSU Bison did not make the semifinals.

On October 2, 2021 the NDSU Bison played in-state rival North Dakota in Grand Forks for the first time since 2003, with NDSU ranked 5th and UND ranked 10th at the time respectively. The Bison won this matchup, 16-10. On November 6, 2021, the 22nd edition of the battle for the Dakota Marker ended with a SDSU victory, 27-19. NDSU was ranked 2nd at the time and SDSU ranked 9th, respectively. This marked the first time SDSU had won multiple games in a row in the Marker series since 2016-2017 when the Jacks won back to back marker games against the Bison.

On January 8, 2022, the Bison played the Montana State Bobcats for the FCS championship. They ended up winning, 38-10, as FB Hunter Luepke ran for 3 touchdowns in the first half.

On January 8, 2023, the Bison lost the 2023 NCAA Division I Football Championship Game to rival South Dakota State, 21-45. This was NDSU's first loss in a Division I championship game, and only their 3rd at any level.

Championships

National championships
North Dakota State have won 17 national championships: three as a member of the College Division (precursor of Division II), five as a member of Division II, and nine as a member of Division I FCS. The Bison have been the runner-up three times (1967, 1981, 1984) and have appeared in a total of 19 national championship games.

Conference championships
North Dakota State has won 37 conference championships, 24 outright and 12 shared; North Central Conference (26), Great West (1), Missouri Valley (10)

† Co-champions

Playoff history

Division I FCS
(2004–present)

North Dakota State has appeared in a total of 13 NCAA Division I FCS playoffs, all of which have been consecutive. The Bison have an overall record of 42–4 in postseason play since becoming eligible in 2008, including a record streak of 22 consecutive playoff wins from 2011 to 2016. NDSU has won 9 National Championship games, lost 1 and have advanced to the Quarterfinal Round in every playoff they have appeared in. Every playoff game NDSU has lost (3), has been to the eventual FCS National Champion that year.

Division II
(1964–2003)

North Dakota State appeared in 23 NCAA Division II postseasons from 1964 to 2003.
During this stretch NDSU compiled a 347–94–4 record winning almost 80% of their games for four decades and claiming eight Championships along the way. NDSU appeared in seven out of 10 Championship games from 1981 to 1990; including appearing in four straight Championship games, an unrivaled number in DII as they posted a 111–16–2 (.875) mark from 1981 to 1990. While this is a startling record, from 1964 to 1973 the Bison went 90–12–1 (.887) which included a 35-game unbeaten streak.

 At the end of the 1984 championship game NDSU took the lead on a field goal making it 17–15 with 1:36 left; after being on the Troy State 2-yard line and settling for 3 points. Troy State subsequently drove down the field with no timeouts to the Bison's 33 yard line with :15 remaining. With apparent confusion on the field Troy State (known since 2005 as simply Troy) rushed the field goal team out on the field and freshman kicker Ted Clem kicked the longest field goal in Troy history of 50 yards as time expired to give the Trojans the victory.

Rivalries

North Dakota

South Dakota State

Northern Iowa

The Bison are 25–16 against Northern Iowa all time. Both Chris Klieman and Matt Entz spend time on the UNI defensive staff before getting hired away to NDSU. Kleiman, in particular, played football at Northern Iowa and spent two separate stints on the Panther coaching staff. The two schools played every season from 1954 to 1979 as members of the North Central Conference. The schools were reunited in 2008 when NDSU moved to the Missouri Valley Football Conference. Northern Iowa won the first three battles, with the 2009 edition marked by a sideline fight between the two sides.

In the early 2010s North Dakota State-UNI was regularly one of the highest-profile games of the season, and the two considered each other to be top rivals. In 2011 the #3 ranked Bison hosted #2 UNI in front of a near-capacity crowd of 18,886. The herd won the matchup 27–19 in a game sometimes regarded as the start of the NDSU dynasty. Two seasons later NDSU would again host UNI in a top-five matchup, the Herd won the game by a narrow margin of 24–23, by far the closest matchup of the 2013 season. The following year the Panthers would be the team to end NDSU's record-breaking 33 game winning streak, thoroughly thrashing the three-time defending champions 23–3.

The 2015 edition of the rivalry was one of the most interesting in the series, and is considered one of the greatest games in NDSU history. The game was announced as homecoming before the season, the day started with SportsCenter's "On the Road Show" broadcasting live from the Fargodome. The #3 Bison trailed nearly all-game before Carson Wentz hit future Green Bay Packers receiver Darrius Shepherd (who didn't play most of the first half due to injury) in the endzone for the game-winning touchdown with less than a minute remaining. Recently the rivalry has cooled as the Bison have won six straight in the series, with the 2018 and 2019 edition being won by a combined score of 102–45.

Head coaches

Matt Entz is the 31st and current head coach of the Bison, taking over after the team won the 2018 FCS championship game. He succeeded Chris Klieman, who was named as the replacement for the retiring Bill Snyder as head coach of Kansas State University during the 2018 playoff run. Klieman continued to serve as the Bison's head coach throughout NDSU's playoff run, finishing his five seasons in Fargo (2014–2018) with a 69–6 record and four FCS national championships, failing to win the title only in 2016. Craig Bohl holds the record for most wins in school history with 104 in his 11-year career averaging over 9.5 wins per season. Ron Erhardt holds the record for most conference titles won with 6, followed by Rocky Hager and Klieman with 5 each.

Facilities

The Bison have played in the Fargodome since it opened in 1993. It holds 18,700 for football games and over 19,000 including standing room only tickets. The record attendance at the Fargodome is 19,108 when the Bison played Missouri State on October 12, 2013. The Bison have only lost one playoff game in the history of the Fargodome. The tremendous crowd noise caused by the Fargodome's steel roof disrupts many opposing offenses and creates one of the best home field advantages in college football

Football Records in the Fargodome
 Playoffs: 33–1
 Home Openers: 28–1
 Overall Record: 183–28
 Record Attendance: 19,108 on 10-12-2013 vs. Missouri State

In 2011, the Fargodome was ranked as the 49th best stadium in all of college football. The article cites, "There aren't many indoor venues in college football, but the few that do exist at the non-FBS level are very unfriendly to any visiting team. That effect is only amplified in a playoff atmosphere." The Fargodome is routinely ranked as one of the loudest college football stadiums in the country. In 2016, Stadium Journey ranked the Fargodome as the #2 Best FCS stadium to experience a game in  On December 10, 2011 in a game against Lehigh, the crowd noise was measured at 111 decibels, comparable to when the New Orleans Saints play in the Superdome. During the 2011 playoffs, the decibel level spiked past 130 decibels several times but was not an official measurement. On December 14, 2012 in an FCS semifinal game against Georgia Southern, the crowd noise exceeded the 115 decibel mark and was known to be one of the loudest games in NDSU history. The Forum of Fargo-Moorhead conducted an informal study of Fargodome crowd noise from the press box during a playoff semifinal game, December 2013. The readings showed a high of 111 decibels following a late touchdown by quarterback Brock Jensen. The decibel meter consistently read 102–106 throughout that game, according to The Forum. NDSU to study decibel levels at playoff football game During the 2013 Furman playoff game, the crowd noise was measured at 115 decibels. During the 2015 playoffs against Montana, the crowd noise measured 120 decibels, the Bison beat the Grizzlies 37–6, avenging their season-opening loss in Missoula. The record for the loudest indoor stadium crowd was set in 2013 at the Sacramento Kings' former home of Sleep Train Arena at 126 decibels. Due to the notorious noise, the Fargodome is sometimes referred to as the "Thunderdome". An example of this loudness can be found when the Bison offense advances the ball and gets a "first down". The announcer says over the loud speaker, "With that carry/pass, thats another Bison", in which the crowd loudly responds in unison "FIRST DOWN...AH MOVE THE CHAINS". Although an announcer declaring a "first down" is not unique to the Fargodome, the audience's response along with the prompt to move the chains is fairly unique to the Fargodome. This tradition was started back in the days when the team played in Dacotah Field. The crowd would do the traditional chant after every Bison first down and it was carried over to the FargoDome when the team played its first game in the new facility.

Prior to the Fargodome, the team played at Dacotah Field from 1910 to 1992.

Records and streaks

FCS records 
 39 Consecutive Wins (2017–2021)
 30 Straight Weeks at #1 in the FCS Coaches Poll (2012–2014)
 20 Straight Weeks at #1 in the STATS Poll (2012-2013) (30 weeks at #1 out of 31)

All-Americans
The list below covers North Dakota State All-Americans since the 2004 season when the program joined the FCS. This list uses six total selectors, the Associated Press (AP), STATS FCS (once they began coverage in 2015), HERO sports (once they began coverage in 2016), TSN (who began FCS coverage in 2006 and stopped in 2014), the American Football Coaches Association (AFCA), and the Athletic Directors Association (ADA). 

This list is in progress.

NFL players
 Billy Turner, Denver Broncos
 Carson Wentz, free agent
 Joe Haeg, Cleveland Browns
 Chris Board, Detroit Lions
 Easton Stick, Los Angeles Chargers
 Derrek Tuszka, Los Angeles Chargers
 Ben Ellefson, Minnesota Vikings
 Trey Lance, San Francisco 49ers
 Dillon Radunz, Tennessee Titans
 Jabril Cox, Dallas Cowboys
 Christian Watson, Green Bay Packers
 Cordell Volson, Cincinnati Bengals

Future non-conference opponents 
Announced schedules as of January 21, 2023.

References

External links

 

 
American football teams established in 1894
1894 establishments in North Dakota